Potato Lake is an unincorporated community and cluster subdivision within northern Saskatchewan, Canada. It is recognized as a designated place by Statistics Canada.

Geography 
Potato Lake is along Highway 2 on the western shore of Potato Lake.

Demographics 

References 

Division No. 18, Saskatchewan
Designated places in Saskatchewan